John Behlmann is an American actor known for such plays, musicals, films and television series as The 39 Steps, Significant Other,   Tootsie, The Wolf of Wall Street, Revolutionary Road, Guiding Light and All My Children.

Education 
He is a graduate of Wesleyan University and The National Theatre Conservatory.

Personal life 
John Behlmann has one child.

Filmography

Film

Television

Video games

References

External links
 
 

21st-century American male actors
American male film actors
American male stage actors
American male television actors
American male voice actors
Living people
Year of birth missing (living people)
Place of birth missing (living people)